Monaghan is a town in County Monaghan, Ireland.

Monaghan, a variant of the Gaelic manacháin, meaning "little monk", may also refer to:

Places 
 County Monaghan, a county in Ulster province, in the Republic of Ireland
 Monaghan (Dáil constituency), a former parliamentary constituency in Ireland spanning the whole of County Monaghan

 Monaghan, County Fermanagh, a townland in County Fermanagh, Northern Ireland
 Monaghan Township, York County, Pennsylvania, U.S.
 Cavan Monaghan, a township in Peterborough County, Ontario, Canada
 Otonabee–South Monaghan, a township in Peterborough County, Ontario, Canada

Constituencies
Monaghan County (Parliament of Ireland constituency), until 1800
Monaghan Borough (Parliament of Ireland constituency), until 1800
Monaghan (UK Parliament constituency), 1801–1885
North Monaghan (UK Parliament constituency), 1885–1922
South Monaghan (UK Parliament constituency), 1885–1922
Monaghan (Dáil constituency), 1921–1977
Cavan–Monaghan (Dáil constituency), beginning 1977

People 
See Monaghan (surname)
 Cameron Monaghan (born 1993), an American actor currently on Shameless
 Craig Monaghan (born 1957), former chief financial officer of the Sears Holdings Corporation
 Dominic Monaghan (born 1976), an English actor
 Katherine Monaghan (born 1980), a British actress
Gerry Monaghan (1915–1973), a Canadian politician 
 John R. Monaghan (1873–1899), an officer in the United States Navy
 Joseph P. Monaghan (1906–1985), a U.S. Representative from Montana
 Mark Monaghan (born 1974), a member of the Scottish band Saor Patrol
 Michael Monaghan (born 1980), an Australian Rugby League player
 Michelle Monaghan (born 1976), an American actress
 Nicola Monaghan, an English novelist
 Patricia Monaghan (born 1946), an American poet and author
 Rinty Monaghan (1920–1984), Northern Irish World flyweight champion
 Thomas Monaghan (VC) (1833–1895), a Welsh trumpeter who received the Victoria Cross for actions during the Indian Rebellion of 1857
 Tom Monaghan (born 1937), founder of Domino's Pizza and Roman Catholic philanthropist

Other 
 Monaghan United F.C., an Irish football (soccer) club
 USS Monaghan, the name of two ships in the US Navy named after John R. Monaghan
 USS Monaghan (DD-32), a Paulding-class destroyer, which served in World War I
 USS Monaghan (DD-354), the last Farragut class destroyer built, which served in World War II at Pearl Harbor and the Battle of Midway

See also
Minihan
Monahan
Moynahan
Moynihan (surname)